Abu Dali  is a Syrian village located in Uqayribat Subdistrict in Salamiyah District, Hama.  According to the Syria Central Bureau of Statistics (CBS), Abu Dali had a population of 288 in the 2004 census. Abu Dali was captured by Syrian Army on 7 September 2017.

References 

Populated places in Salamiyah District